Utricularia breviscapa is a small to medium suspended aquatic carnivorous plant that belongs to the genus Utricularia (family Lentibulariaceae). It is probably an annual plant. Its native distribution includes the Antilles and South America.

See also 
 List of Utricularia species

References 

Carnivorous plants of North America
Carnivorous plants of South America
Freshwater plants
Flora of Argentina
Flora of Bolivia
Flora of Brazil
Flora of Colombia
Flora of Cuba
Flora of Ecuador
Flora of Guyana
Flora of Paraguay
Flora of Venezuela
breviscapa
Flora without expected TNC conservation status